Zargo Touré (born 11 November 1989) is a Senegalese professional footballer who plays as a midfielder for French club Dijon.

Career
Touré was born in Pikine, Senegal. He began his career at homeland club Sporting Dakar in the Senegalese capital.

Touré joined US Boulogne in 2008, after interest from Olympique Marseille and En Avant Guingamp. He was assigned the number 29 shirt. He plays alongside compatriots Ibrahima Sané – whom he lived with, and Mame N'Diaye, who is on loan from Marseille. He played for Senegal at the 2012 Summer Olympics.

On 31 August 2015, Touré joined the French Ligue 1 side Lorient from Le Havre. On 30 January 2016, he scored two goals against Reims in Lorient's 2–0 win . He was also the man of the match.

On 28 July 2021, he returned to France and signed a two-year contract with Dijon.

References

External links
 
 Profile on Eurosport
 Profile at No Left Foot
 Interview (French)
 Feature (French)
 

Living people
1989 births
Association football midfielders
Senegalese footballers
Senegal international footballers
Ligue 1 players
Ligue 2 players
Süper Lig players
US Boulogne players
Le Havre AC players
Trabzonspor footballers
Gençlerbirliği S.K. footballers
Dijon FCO players
Senegalese expatriate footballers
Expatriate footballers in France
Senegalese expatriate sportspeople in France
Expatriate footballers in Turkey
Senegalese expatriate sportspeople in Turkey
2011 CAF U-23 Championship players
Olympic footballers of Senegal
Footballers at the 2012 Summer Olympics
2015 Africa Cup of Nations players
2017 Africa Cup of Nations players